Edward Lowber Stokes (September 29, 1880 – November 8, 1964) was an American politician from Philadelphia who served as a Republican member of the U.S. House of Representatives for Pennsylvania's 2nd congressional district from 1931 to 1933 and Pennsylvania's 6th congressional district from 1933 to 1935.

Early life and education
Stokes was born on September 29, 1880 in Philadelphia, Pennsylvania. He graduated from St. Paul's School in Concord, New Hampshire.  He was an international polo player and was captain of the Philadelphia Country Club polo team. Stokes served as a vestryman for Christ Church in Philadelphia from 1913 to 1940.

Career
He was employed as a clerk for a trust company and later engaged as an investment dealer.  He founded the company Edward Stokes & Co. He was an unsuccessful candidate for election to the Pennsylvania House of Representatives in 1930.

Stokes was elected as a Republican to the 72nd Congress in 1931 to fill the vacancy caused by the death of George S. Graham and served until 1935. He was not a candidate for renomination because he was a gubernatorial candidate in 1934. He was again a candidate for Congress in 1950, and a candidate for mayor and councilman at large in 1952. He remained engaged in investment banking until his retirement in 1955.

He died in Willistown Township, Pennsylvania on November 8, 1964 and was interred at St. David's Episcopal Church in Radnor, Pennsylvania.

References

1880 births
1964 deaths
20th-century American politicians
American company founders
American investment bankers
American polo players
Burials at St. David's Episcopal Church (Radnor, Pennsylvania)
Politicians from Philadelphia
Republican Party members of the United States House of Representatives from Pennsylvania
St. Paul's School (New Hampshire) alumni